Naso caesius, the gray unicornfish, is a tropical fish found in coral reefs in the Pacific Ocean.

References

Naso (fish)
Fish of Hawaii
Fish described in 1992